The value of structural health information is the expected utility gain of a built environment system by information provided by structural health monitoring (SHM). The quantification of the value of structural health information is based on decision analysis adapted to built environment engineering.

Background 
The value of structural health information takes basis in the framework of the decision analysis and the value of information analysis as introduced by Raiffa and Schlaifer. and adapted to civil engineering by Benjamin and Cornell. Decision theory itself is based upon the expected utility hypothesis by Von Neumann and Morgenstern.  The concepts for the value of structural health information in built environment engineering were first formulated by Pozzi and Der Kiureghian and Faber and Thöns.

Formulation 
The value of structural health information is quantified with a normative decision analysis.

The expected values of the utilities are calculated with interrelated performance models of the built environment system, structural health information, structural health actions and with utility and consequence models. The expected utility value quantification is subjected to an optimization of structural health information system parameters and information dependent actions.

Application 
The value of structural health information provides a quantitative decision basis for (1) implementing SHM or not, (2) the identification of the optimal SHM strategy and (3) for planning optimal structural health actions, such as e.g., repair and replacement. It has been shown that the value of structural health information can be very significant for the risk and integrity management of engineering structures.

References 

Infrastructure
Architecture academics